Father Conceicao Rodrigues Institute of Technology (FCRIT) is a private engineering college affiliated to the University of Mumbai located in Vashi, Navi Mumbai. The institute offers the B.E degree courses in Computer Engineering, Electrical Engineering, Mechanical Engineering, Electronics and Telecommunication Engineering and Information Technology.

Accreditation and affiliation

FCRIT is a private, un-aided, minority, non-autonomous institute affiliated to the University of Mumbai. It offers a four-year baccalaureate course culminating in the B.E. degree conferred by the university. The institute has been graded "A" by the Directorate of Technical Education, Government of Maharashtra State. It is recognised by the AICTE and has received accreditation from the National Board of Accreditation(NBA), New Delhi.

History
FCRIT was established in 1994 as a part of the Agnel Technical Education Complex at Vashi, which itself was established in 1984. The institute is named after late Rev. Fr. Conceicao Rodrigues, who died in odour of sanctity.

Admissions
The admission process is highly competitive and is undertaken as per the directives of the Directorate of Technical Education(DTE), Maharashtra State.

Eligibility criteria
For admission to the FCRIT, prospective candidates from the native state of Maharashtra need to pass their Higher Secondary (School) Certificate / Standard XII examination of the Maharashtra State Board of Secondary and Higher Secondary Education or its equivalent from CBSE or CISCE. All prospective candidates need to have had the subjects of English, Physics, Chemistry and Mathematics in their curriculum and should have obtained a minimum of 50% marks in the Science subjects (Physics, Chemistry) and Mathematics added together.

Prospective candidates from outside the state of Maharashtra can also apply provided they satisfy the required eligibility criteria.

Entrance test
Prospective students need to take the Maharashtra Engineering Common Entrance Test or MAH-EN-CET. The MAH-EN-CET consists of only one common exam that is divided into 3 sections - physics, chemistry and mathematics with 50 multiple choice questions in each. The total score in these sections taken together decides the merit list for the exam in a given year. The syllabus for preparing for the MAH-EN-CET is the same as the Physics, Chemistry and Mathematics syllabus prescribed by the Maharashtra State Board of Secondary and Higher Secondary Education for the Higher Secondary (School) Certificate / Standard XII examination conducted in the current academic year. This merit list is used as a differentiating factor for admissions to FCRIT.

The All India Engineering Entrance Examination or AIEEE held by Central Board of Secondary Education (CBSE) under guidance of the Ministry of Human Resource Development (India) is also accepted as an alternative.

Placements
The placement program starts in the month of June or July every year and students who have completed three years of the four-year course are eligible to register. The program spans more than a year and runs through the final year of the course for a batch of students.

The institute claims to have a nearly 100% conversion ratio of eligible students to company offers. The placement activities are looked after by faculty placement officers and student coordinators. The central placement cell is located in the administrative block, south of the reception.

A list of recent recruiters is also available on the institute's website.

Related links
 University of Mumbai
 Agnel Ashram
 Fr. Conceicao Rodrigues College of Engineering (FCRCE)

References

External links
 Fr. Conceicao Rodrigues Institute of Technology (FCRIT), Vashi
 FCRIT Alumni Association
 University of Mumbai - official website
 Directorate of Technical Education, Maharashtra State
 All India Council for Technical Education
 National Board of Accreditation
 Fr. Conceicao Rodrigues College of Engineering (FCRCE), Bandra

Education in Navi Mumbai
Engineering colleges in Mumbai
Affiliates of the University of Mumbai